F. Ad. Richter & Cie was founded and owned by Friedrich Adolf Richter. This German manufacturer produced many products, including pharmaceuticals, music boxes, gramophones, and Anchor Stone building sets.  He established his main factory in Rudolstadt, Germany. In addition, the company had factories in Vienna Austria, Nuremberg Germany, New York City USA, and St. Petersburg, Russia. In addition, the company had operations for internal supply in Konstein, Germany (glass bottles) and Leipzig, Germany (publishing - printing was done in Rudolstadt).

Friedrich Adolf Richter was born 1847 in Herford, North Rhine-Westphalia and died 1910 in Jena. The Anker factory produced the popular Anchor Stone Blocks from the 1880 up to 1963. 

The factory was refounded in 1995 by a group of enthusiasts and began producing some of the old sets again. They are also selling toys in Grayford.

References 

Toy companies of Germany
Toy companies established in the 19th century
Manufacturing companies established in 1880
German companies established in 1880